Leslie Charles Bruckner (April 16, 1918 – September 21, 2014) was an American football player.  He played college football for Michigan State College (later known as Michigan State University). He also played professional football in the National Football League for the Chicago Cardinals in 1945. He appeared in two games, recovered one fumble, and returned one kickoff for 13 yards.

He died in 2014 in Pasadena, California.

References

1918 births
2014 deaths
American football tackles
Michigan State Spartans football players
Chicago Cardinals players
Players of American football from Michigan
People from Milan, Michigan